Nikos Milios (born 1 August 1995) is a Greek professional footballer.

Youth career
Milios began his career with Elpides Agrinio.  He signed with the youth club of Panetolikos on 11 July 2011.

Club career

Panetolikos
Milios signed a professional contract with Panetolikos in August 2012.

Milios made his first-team debut on 13 April 2014, playing against OFI for the 2013–14 Superleague Greece.

On 22 January 2016, Panetolikos announced that Milios was going on a six-month loan to Acharnaikos

Panthrakikos
On 22 August 2016, Milios signed a contract with Panthrakikos.

References

External links

1995 births
Living people
Greek footballers
Panetolikos F.C. players
Association football forwards